Čitluk is a town and municipality in the Herzegovina-Neretva Canton of the Federation of Bosnia and Herzegovina, an entity of Bosnia and Herzegovina.

The area boasts the largest vineyards in the country, consisting mainly of Blatina, Žilavka, and Vranac grapes.

Overview
The municipality includes the village of Međugorje where Marian apparitions have been reported.

Other nearby places are Služanj, Potpolje, Blatnica, Čerin, Hamzići and Gornji Veliki Ograđenik.
The rich soil in this area is used for growing wine-producing grapes. Many varieties grown in Brotnjo are popular throughout the world (e.g., Blatina).

Settlements

Population/Demographics

1971
15,359 total
 Croats - 15,055 (98.02%)
 Bosniaks - 183 (1.19%)
 Serbs - 64 (0.41%)
 others - 57 (0.38%)

1991
In 1991, the municipality had a population of 14,709, of which there were 
14,544 Croats (98.9%)
110 Bosniaks (0.8%)
19 Serbs (0.1%)
17 Yugoslavs (0.1%) * 19 others (0.1%)

The town of Čitluk had 4,317 residents: with 99% of those being Croats.

2013 Census

Sports
The town is home to the football club NK Brotnjo, and the basketball club HKK Brotnjo.

Notable people
Marin Čilić, tennis player
Zoran Planinić, basketball player
Mate Bulić, singer
Ivica Zubac, basketball player
fra Didak Buntić, Catholic priest

Twin towns – sister cities

Čitluk is twinned with:
 Fossò, Italy
 Križevci, Croatia
 Poggio San Marcello, Italy

References

External links

Municipality of Čitluk-official website 

 
Populated places in Čitluk, Bosnia and Herzegovina
Cities and towns in the Federation of Bosnia and Herzegovina